Guinea competed at the 1988 Summer Olympics in Seoul, South Korea.

Competitors
The following is the list of number of competitors in the Games.

Results by event

Athletics
Men's Marathon
Alassane Bah — 3:06.27 (→ 96th place)

References

Official Olympic Reports

Nations at the 1988 Summer Olympics
1988
Oly